Sand pile may refer to:
 Abelian sandpile model
 Catch points